Code of the West is a 1925 American silent Western film directed by William K. Howard and written by Zane Grey and Lucien Hubbard. The film stars Owen Moore, Constance Bennett, Mabel Ballin, Charles Stanton Ogle, David Butler, George Bancroft and Gertrude Short. The film was released on April 6, 1925, by Paramount Pictures.

Plot
As described in a film magazine review, Cal Thurman, a timid fellow, thinking that the woman he is to meet at the train station is an old maid, avoids her when he finds that she is a pretty young woman who flirts with the cowboys. He finally uses rough methods to win her love and, after through flames in a forest fire, succeeds in winning her.

Cast

Preservation
With no prints of Code of the West located in any film archives, it is a lost film.

References

External links
 
 

1925 films
1925 Western (genre) films
Paramount Pictures films
Films directed by William K. Howard
Zane Grey
American black-and-white films
Lost Western (genre) films
Lost American films
1925 lost films
Silent American Western (genre) films
1920s English-language films
1920s American films